In mathematics, a real closed field is a field F that has the same first-order properties as the field of real numbers. Some examples are the field of real numbers, the field of real algebraic numbers, and the field of hyperreal numbers.

Definitions
A real closed field is a field F in which any of the following equivalent conditions is true:

F is elementarily equivalent to the real numbers. In other words, it has the same first-order properties as the reals: any sentence in the first-order language of fields is true in F if and only if it is true in the reals. 
There is a total order on F making it an ordered field such that, in this ordering, every positive element of F has a square root in F and any polynomial of odd degree with coefficients in F has at least one root in F.
F is a formally real field such that every polynomial of odd degree with coefficients in F has at least one root in F, and for every element a of F there is b in F such that a = b2 or a = −b2.
F is not algebraically closed, but its algebraic closure is a finite extension. 
F is not algebraically closed but the field extension  is algebraically closed.
There is an ordering on F that does not extend to an ordering on any proper algebraic extension of F.
F is a formally real field such that no proper algebraic extension of F is formally real.  (In other words, the field is maximal in an algebraic closure with respect to the property of being formally real.) 
There is an ordering on F making it an ordered field such that, in this ordering, the intermediate value theorem holds for all polynomials over F with degree ≥ 0.
 F is a weakly o-minimal ordered field.

If F is an ordered field, the Artin–Schreier theorem states that F has an algebraic extension, called the real closure K of F, such that K is a real closed field whose ordering is an extension of the given ordering on F, and is unique up to a unique isomorphism of fields identical on F (note that every ring homomorphism between real closed fields automatically is order preserving, because x ≤ y if and only if ∃z : y = x + z2). For example, the real closure of the ordered field of rational numbers is the field  of real algebraic numbers. The theorem is named for Emil Artin and Otto Schreier, who proved it in 1926.

If (F, P) is an ordered field, and E is a Galois extension of F, then by Zorn's lemma there is a maximal ordered field extension (M, Q) with M a subfield of E containing F and the order on M extending P. This M, together with its ordering Q, is called the relative real closure of (F, P) in E.  We call (F, P)  real closed relative to E if M is just F.  When E is the algebraic closure of F the relative real closure of F in E is actually the real closure of F described earlier.

If F is a field (no ordering compatible with the field operations is assumed, nor is it assumed that F is orderable) then F still has a real closure, which may not be a field anymore, but just a
real closed ring. For example, the real closure of the field  is the ring  (the two copies correspond to the two orderings of ). On the other hand, if  is considered as an ordered subfield 

Decidability and quantifier elimination
The language of real closed fields  includes symbols for the operations of addition and multiplication, the constants 0 and 1, and the order relation  (as well as equality, if this is not considered a logical symbol). In this language, the (first-order) theory of real closed fields, consists of the following:

 the axioms of ordered fields;
 the axiom asserting that every positive number has a square root;
 for every odd number , the axiom asserting that all polynomials of degree  have at least one root.

All of the above axioms can be expressed in first-order logic (i.e. quantification ranges only over elements of the field).

Tarski proved that  is complete, meaning that for any -sentence, it can be proven either true or false from the above axioms. Furthermore,  is decidable, meaning that there is an algorithm to decide the truth or falsity of any such sentence.

The Tarski–Seidenberg theorem extends this result to decidable quantifier elimination. That is, there is an algorithm that, given any -formula, which may contain free variables, produces an equivalent quantifier-free formula in the same free variables, where equivalent means that the two formulas are true for exactly the same values of the variables. The Tarski–Seidenberg theorem is an extension of the decidability theorem, as it can be easily checked whether a quantifier-free formula without free variables is true or false.

This theorem can be further extended to the following projection theorem. Such a subset is called a semialgebraic set. The projection theorem asserts that a projection of a semialgebraic set is a semialgebraic set, and that there is an algorithm that, given a quantifier-free formula defining a semialgebraic set, produces a quantifier-free formula for its projection.

In fact, the projection theorem is equivalent to quantifier elimination, as the projection of a semialgebraic set defined by the formula  is defined by

where  and  represent respectively the set of eliminated variables, and the set of kept variables.

The decidability of a first-order theory of the real numbers depends dramatically on the primitive operations and functions that are considered (here addition and multiplication). Adding other functions symbols, for example, the sine or the exponential function, can provide undecidable theories; see Richardson's theorem and Decidability of first-order theories of the real numbers.

Complexity of deciding 𝘛rcf 
Tarski's original algorithm for quantifier elimination has nonelementary computational complexity, meaning that no tower

can bound the execution time of the algorithm if  is the size of the input formula. The cylindrical algebraic decomposition, introduced by George E. Collins, provides a much more practicable algorithm of complexity 

Davenport and Heintz (1988) proved that this worst-case complexity is nearly optimal for quantifier elimination by producing a family  of formulas of length , with  quantifiers, and involving polynomials of constant degree, such that any quantifier-free formula equivalent to  must involve polynomials of degree  and length  where  is big Omega notation. This shows that both the time complexity and the space complexity of quantifier elimination are intrinsically double exponential.

For the decision problem, Ben-Or, Kozen, and Reif (1986) claimed to have proved that the theory of real closed fields is decidable in exponential space, and therefore in double exponential time, but their argument (in the case of more than one variable) is generally held as flawed; see Renegar (1992) for a discussion.

For purely existential formulas, that is for formulas of the form 

where  stands for either  or , the complexity is lower. Basu and Roy (1996) provided  a well-behaved algorithm to decide the truth of such an existential formula with complexity of  arithmetic operations and polynomial space.

Order properties 

A crucially important property of the real numbers is that it is an Archimedean field, meaning it has the Archimedean property that for any real number, there is an integer larger than it in absolute value. An equivalent statement is that for any real number, there are integers both larger and smaller. Such real closed fields that are not Archimedean, are non-Archimedean ordered fields.  For example, any field of hyperreal numbers is real closed and non-Archimedean.

The Archimedean property is related to the concept of cofinality. A set X contained in an ordered set F is cofinal in F if for every y in F there is an x in X such that y < x. In other words, X is an unbounded sequence in F. The cofinality of F is the cardinality of the smallest cofinal set, which is to say, the size of the smallest cardinality giving an unbounded sequence. For example, natural numbers are cofinal in the reals, and the cofinality of the reals is therefore .

We have therefore the following invariants defining the nature of a real closed field F:

 The cardinality of F.
 The cofinality of F.

To this we may add

 The weight of F, which is the minimum size of a dense subset of F.

These three cardinal numbers tell us much about the order properties of any real closed field, though it may be difficult to discover what they are, especially if we are not willing to invoke the generalized continuum hypothesis. There are also particular properties that may or may not hold:

 A field F is complete if there is no ordered field K properly containing F such that F is dense in K. If the cofinality of F is κ, this is equivalent to saying Cauchy sequences indexed by κ are convergent in F.
 An ordered field F has the eta set property ηα, for the ordinal number α, if for any two subsets L and U of F of cardinality less than  such that every element of L is less than every element of U, there is an element x in F with x larger than every element of L and smaller than every element of U. This is closely related to the model-theoretic property of being a saturated model; any two real closed fields are ηα if and only if they are -saturated, and moreover two ηα real closed fields both of cardinality  are order isomorphic.

The generalized continuum hypothesis 

The characteristics of real closed fields become much simpler if we are willing to assume the generalized continuum hypothesis. If the continuum hypothesis holds, all real closed fields with cardinality of the continuum and having the η1 property are order isomorphic. This is the most commonly used hyperreal number field in nonstandard analysis, and its uniqueness is equivalent to the continuum hypothesis. (Even without the continuum hypothesis we have that if the cardinality of the continuum is
 then we have a unique ηβ field of size ηβ.)

Moreover, we do not need ultrapowers to construct Ϝ, we can do so much more constructively as the subfield of series with a countable number of nonzero terms of the field  of formal power series on a totally ordered abelian divisible group G that is an η1 group of cardinality  .

It is not an ultrapower but it is a hyperreal field, and hence a suitable field for the usages of nonstandard analysis.

Examples of real closed fields 

 the real algebraic numbers
 the computable numbers
 the definable numbers
 the real numbers
 superreal numbers
 hyperreal numbers
 the Puiseux series with real coefficients
 the surreal numbers

Notes

References 

 Basu, Saugata, Richard Pollack, and Marie-Françoise Roy (2003) "Algorithms in real algebraic geometry" in Algorithms and computation in mathematics. Springer.  (online version)
 Michael Ben-Or, Dexter Kozen, and John Reif, The complexity of elementary algebra and geometry, Journal of Computer and Systems Sciences 32 (1986), no. 2, pp. 251–264.
 Caviness, B F, and Jeremy R. Johnson, eds. (1998) Quantifier elimination and cylindrical algebraic decomposition. Springer. 
 Chen Chung Chang and Howard Jerome Keisler (1989) Model Theory. North-Holland.
 Dales, H. G., and W. Hugh Woodin (1996) Super-Real Fields. Oxford Univ. Press.
 
 
 Macpherson, D., Marker, D. and Steinhorn, C., Weakly o-minimal structures and real closed fields, Trans. of the American Math. Soc., Vol. 352, No. 12, 1998.
 Mishra, Bhubaneswar (1997) "Computational Real Algebraic Geometry," in Handbook of Discrete and Computational Geometry. CRC Press. 2004 edition, p. 743. 
 
 
  
Alfred Tarski (1951) A Decision Method for Elementary Algebra and Geometry. Univ. of California Press.

External links

Real Algebraic and Analytic Geometry Preprint Server
Model Theory preprint server

 
Field (mathematics)
Real algebraic geometry